Conwell-Egan Catholic High School is a coeducational, Catholic high school in Fairless Hills, Pennsylvania. It is located in the Roman Catholic Archdiocese of Philadelphia.

Athletics 
The boys' basketball team won the PIAA Class AA State Championship on March 21, 2015.

Notable alumni
 Keith Armstrong (born 1963, class of 1982), Tampa Bay Buccaneers special teams coordinator
 Jim Cawley (born 1969, class of 1987), former Lieutenant Governor of Pennsylvania
 Brian Fitzpatrick (born 1973, class of 1992), 2-term U.S. House Representative (PA-8 (2016-2018), PA-1 (2018–Present)) 
 Mike Fitzpatrick (1963–2020, class of 1981), 4-term U.S. House Representative (PA-8)
 Larry Marshall (born 1950, class of 1968), defensive back, kick returner and wide receiver for NFL's Kansas City Chiefs and  Philadelphia Eagles
 Joe McEwing (born 1972, class of 1990), former professional baseball player, current Chicago White Sox 3rd base coach
 Leo Rossi (born 1946), actor, star of such films as The Accused, Relentless and Analyze This
 Mark S. Schweiker (born 1953, class of 1970), former Governor of Pennsylvania
 Steve Slaton (born 1986, class of 2005), All-American football running back, Heisman Trophy finalist, Miami Dolphins running back
 Thomas G. Waites (born 1955), actor and playwright, star of such films as The Warriors, The Thing and And Justice for All
 Bob Zupcic (born 1966, class of 1984), outfielder who played in MLB for the Boston Red Sox and Chicago White Sox

References

External links

Catholic secondary schools in Pennsylvania
Roman Catholic Archdiocese of Philadelphia
Educational institutions established in 1957
Schools in Bucks County, Pennsylvania
1957 establishments in Pennsylvania